Mr India or Rubaru Mr. India  is a national beauty pageant for men in India. The pageant was created by Rubaru Group in the year 2004. It is responsible for sending India’s representatives to international pageants – Caballero Universal, Mister Global, Mister Model International, Mister Model Worldwide, Mister Grand International, Mister Tourism World, Mister International, Mister National Universe, Mister Friendship International, Mister Star Universe and Mister Fashion Model. The pageant is India’s oldest surviving national male pageant. It was founded by the president of Rubaru Group, Sandeep Kumar in the Indian state of Haryana, and Pankaj Kharbanda is the vice president of the pageant.

History 
Rubaru Mr. India pageant was created in 2004, however it started sending India’s representatives to international pageants from 2014. Pratik Virk became the first Rubaru Mr. India winner to go to an international pageant. He represented India at Mister Model International 2014 competition held in Dominican Republic and was adjudged fourth runner-up. The following years, Rubaru Mr. India pageant acquired franchise rights of other international pageants in India. In 2016, Prateek Baid represented India at Mister Global 2016 contest held in Thailand and won Best Model award.

Titleholders

Mister India titleholders

See also 

 Prateek Baid
 Gopinath Ravi
 Amit Khanna (photographer)

References

External links 

 Rubar Mister India on  Instagram

Beauty pageants in India
India
Indian awards
Mister Global by country